The Jubaland Darawiish Force is a paramilitary force that forms the security unit of Jubaland, an autonomous federated state in southern Somalia. The Jubaland Darawiish started operating under the administration of Ahmed Madobe. Headquartered in Kismayo, one of its primary bases is located in Afmadow. Jubaland president Madobe has said that the force aims to focus on counter-terrorism and provocative actors within the state of Jubaland. The unit is commanded by Lt. Col Mahad Islaam.

See also
Puntland Security Force
Dervish movement (Somali)

References

Jubaland
Military of Somalia
Law enforcement in Somalia